IEB may refer to:

 Independent Examinations Board, a South African independent assessment agency
 Institution of Engineers, Bangladesh, the national professional organisation of engineers in Bangladesh
 Instituto Estudios Bursátiles, a Spanish higher education institution
 International Economics Bulletin, a bi-monthly publication published by the Carnegie Endowment for International Peace